Ramones Maniacs is a 2001 tribute album to the punk rock band the Ramones, released by Trend Is Dead! Records. The album's track list is an exact match of the band's 1988 compilation album Ramones Mania, which had been released by Sire Records. The album has 26 tracks, played by bands from across the United States, plus one from Australia and one from Canada. Ramones bassist Dee Dee Ramone plays on the track "Blitzkrieg Bop", along with the band of which he was then a member, Youth Gone Mad.

All artwork was created by Tim Bradstreet.

Cited as having the "Greatest Number of God-Awful Band Names" by Mark Prindle of SPIN magazine in 2009.

Almost every song from this album was used, without authorization, for the bootleg series RAMONES: The Tribute Vol. 1-8.

Track listing
“I Wanna Be Sedated” by Tiltwheel
“Teenage Lobotomy” by Cletus
“Do You Remember Rock ‘n’ Roll Radio?" by Bracket
“Gimme Gimme Shock Treatment” by Santa’s Dead
“Beat On The Brat” by Yogurt
“Sheena Is A Punk Rocker” by Love Camp 7
“I Wanna Live” by Frantics
“Pinhead” by Furious George
“Blitzkrieg Bop” by Youth Gone Mad featuring Dee Dee Ramone
“Cretin Hop” by Courtney Ono
“Rockaway Beach” by Dead End Kids
“Commando” by The Young Hasselhoffs
“I Wanna Be Your Boyfriend” by The Vapids
“Mama’s Boy” by Yanni Rotten
“Bop ‘Til You Drop” by Frantics
“We’re A Happy Family” by Fallen Star
“Bonzo Goes To Bitburg” by Blanks 77
“Outsider” by Cletus
“Psycho Therapy” by Napkin
“Wart Hog” by Santa’s Dead
“Animal Boy” by Hammerbrain
“Needles & Pins” by The Commercials
“Howling At The Moon (Sha-La-La)” by Politically Erect
“Somebody Put Something In My Drink” by Spazboy
“We Want The Airwaves” by Spazboy
“Chinese Rocks” by Green 11’s
“I Just Wanna Have Something To Do” by Black Left Pinky
“The KKK Took My Baby Away” by Loose Change
“Indian Giver” by The Grand Prixx
“Rock ‘n’ Roll High School” by The Vice Dolls

References

2001 compilation albums
Ramones tribute albums
Punk rock compilation albums